Ballinahinch GAA is a Gaelic Athletic Association club based in the parish of Killoscully and Ballinahinch in the north-west of County Tipperary, Ireland. The club plays both Gaelic football and hurling in the North division of Tipperary GAA.

History
The club was founded in 1886, as two separate clubs, Ballinahinch GAA and Killoscully GAA, although there is sources that say Killoscully GAA was in establishment in 1884, the year of the birth of the GAA.

Gaelic football
Although from the beginning the Ballinahinch club was primarily involved in football, hurling is the main sport played in the club, given that the North division is dominated by hurling.

Honours
North Tipperary Senior Football Championship (1)
 (as Mulcair Rovers) 1982
North Tipperary Intermediate Football Championship (1)
2010
 North Tipperary Junior A Football Championship (2)
 1980, 2007
Tipperary Junior 'B' Football Championship (1)
2002
 North Tipperary Junior B Football Championship (4)
 1995, 1998, 2001, 2002
 Tipperary Under-21 B Football Championship (2)
 2001, 2013 (as Ballinahinch Gaels)
 North Tipperary Under-21 B Football Championship (2)
 2001, 2013 (as Ballinahinch Gaels)
 Tipperary Under-21 C Football Championship (2)
 2000, 2009 
 North Tipperary Under-21 C Football Championship (2)
 2000, 2006
 North Tipperary Minor B Football Championship (2)
 1994 (with Burgess), 2002
Tipperary Minor C Football Championship (3)
 2000, 2004, 2010
North Tipperary Minor C Football Championship (1)
 2000

Hurling

In 1980 the club won its first County Junior Hurling title. It has also won many North division titles at Junior, U-21 and Minor levels.

Honours
 North Tipperary Intermediate Hurling Championship (2)
 2016, 2017
Tipperary Intermediate Hurling League (3)
2005, 2015, 2016
Tipperary Junior 'A' Hurling Championship (3)
 1980, 1994, 2002
 North Tipperary Junior A Hurling Championship (6)
 1971, 1980, 1992, 1994, 2001, 2002
 North Tipperary Junior C Hurling Championship (1)
 2012
 North Tipperary Under-21 B Hurling Championship (2)
 2002, 2016 (with Templederry)
 Tipperary Under-21 C Hurling Championship (3)
 2000, 2006, 2011
 North Tipperary Under-21 C Hurling Championship (2)
 2000, 2010
 North Tipperary Minor B Hurling Championship (1)
 1987 (with Ballina)
 Tipperary Minor C Hurling Championship (1)
 2007

Notable players
 Shane McGrath

Shane McGrath and Mike Ryan (Bawn) are the most notable players from Ballinahinch, both having won All Ireland senior medals with Tipperary on 2010 and 1991. Shane and Mike also both played for Tipp at Intermediate and under 21 level, with Mike winning 2 Intermediate All Irelands in 1989 and 1991. Mike also won an u21 All Ireland and has a very rare Oireachtas medal, which there is very few in the country. Shane won 2 Fitzgibbon cups with LIT, these campaigns leading to Shane's call up to the senior set up. 
Other players from the club which have represented the club at county level are Denis O Meara, Phil Collins, Paddy O Meara, Martin O Brien, John Ryan (J), Jimmy Ryan, Tim Walsh, Seán Ryan (N) Philip Kelly, Dermot Gleeson, Marcus Ryan (N) Ger Griffin, Alan Kelly, John Foley, John Ryan (Bawn) and Davy Gleeson. Davy Gleeson has 1 Fitzgibbon cup medal with UL  as well as a minor Munster medal and an U21 All Ireland medal with Tipperary.

References

External links 
Ballinahinch GAA website
Tipperary GAA website

Gaelic games clubs in County Tipperary